Relubbus is a hamlet in the parish of St Hilary, west Cornwall, England. It is on the B3280 road between Townshend and Goldsithney; the River Hayle runs through Relubbus.

History
Just to the east is Tregembo Farmhouse, a grade II* listed building dating from the mid-17th century.

Mining
Relubbus Tin Stream was put up for auction at the Hawkins' Arms, Relubbus on 26 August 1881. The advertisement in The Cornishman newspaper states, that the Tin Stream had been worked successfully for some time by the late Captain Reed of Tregembo. The tin stream was auctioned once more on 24 October 1881, this time under the ownership of Edward Mitchell.

East Tregembo  mine, halfway between Relubbus and Townsend was explored in 1882 by Grenville Sharp of London and Mark R Chegwin. At a four-monthly general meeting in July 1883, the accounts showed a debit of £3013 18s 3d. There was 2000 tons of ore on the surface waiting to be stamped. The mine was closed on 15 February 1884 following a meeting of the shareholders and auctioned on 30 April 1884.

References

Hamlets in Cornwall